The Tupolev Tu-116 is a turboprop-powered long-range airliner designed by the Tupolev design bureau and built in the USSR.

Development
The Tu-116, like the Tu-114, was based on the Tu-95 strategic bomber. Both airliners were developed in parallel with the Tu-116 taking priority due to the numerous visits of General Secretary Nikita Khrushchev to both Western and Eastern countries during the so-called Khrushchev Thaw. The aircraft's mission was to transport the head of state together with his security detail and entourage. Concurrent development of the Tu-114 and Tu-116 was justified by Khrushchev's visit to the United States, at which time the Tu-114 might not have been ready.

Initially, the airliner was to be developed very quickly, in a little over a year, due to the relative simplicity of modifications. However, the initial introduction date was moved from September 1956 to 1957 because the Tupolev Design Bureau was overloaded with military orders.

The airliner received the internal code Tu-114D ("Diplomatic"), which later created some confusion – the Tu-114D was also the official designation of the long-range variant for transatlantic flights, the letter D standing for "dalniy" (Russian for "long-range"), which also had a total of 64 passenger seats.

Design
The airliner was to transport 24 passengers including a cook, a flight attendant, a navigator-announcer to inform the passengers about the flight, and, when necessary, 10–12 armed guards.

Technically, the airliner was not much different from the original Tu-95. The first passenger cabin held six–eight passengers and the second one was designed for three VIP passengers, equipped with beds and couches.

The pressurized cabin led to a short hallway with a staircase which was lowered to allow access from the ground. It also served as an emergency exit.

The flight crew consisted of two pilots, navigator, flight engineer, flight mechanic and radio operator.

Operational history 
The two Tu-116s were modified from two regular Tu-95s, MSN 402 and 409. Neither was ever used to transport the head of state.

After flight testing, both airliners were transferred to the Soviet Air Force and served for various purposes until the early 1990s. One Tu-116 continues to survive to this day, in the Ulyanovsk Baratayevka Airport

Specifications (Tu-116)

References

 

1950s Soviet airliners
Four-engined tractor aircraft
Low-wing aircraft
Aircraft with contra-rotating propellers
Four-engined turboprop aircraft
Tu-0116
Aircraft first flown in 1957